Reinhold Würth (born 20 April 1935) is a German billionaire businessman and art collector. In 1954, at the age of 19, he took over his father's tiny wholesale screw business and built it into the Würth Group, which posted €14.4 billion (US$16.2 billion) in sales in 2020.

Since the 1960s Würth has collected works of art. As of 2021, the collection contains over 18,300 works, specializing in art created from the late 19th century to today.

He is married with three children and lives in Künzelsau, Germany.

Honors and awards 

Würth has received many honors including being inducted into Hall of Fame of German Industry and receiving the Ludwig Erhard medal, which rewards individuals who have attained exemplary results in their work for the public good and for the development of the social market economy.

Würth is an honorary doctor and honorary senator of the University of Tübingen and was awarded the Bundesverdienstkreuz (Grand Cross of the Order of Merit) of the Federal Republic of Germany, the Diesel medal, and the Medal of Merit of the state of Baden-Württemberg.

In March 2004, he received the French medal and was appointed a Knight of the Legion of Honour. On 18 November 2005, he was appointed Officer in the Order of Orange-Nassau, a military and civil order of the Netherlands, by royal decision.

1985 Federal Cross of Merit
1987 Economic Medal of the State of Baden-Württemberg
1991 Honorary Senator of the University of Tübingen
1994 Order of Merit of Baden-Württemberg
1996 Federal Cross of Merit, 1st class
1998 Montblanc de la Culture (for involvement in the promotion of art and culture)
1999: Professor at the University of Karlsruhe (TH), management of inter-faculty Institute for Entrepreneurship
 Honorary doctorate from the Faculty of Economics, University of Tübingen
 Staufer Medal
2000 Chevalier dans l'Ordre des Arts et des Lettres (France)
2001 Innovation Award of the SPD
2002 Reinhold-Maier Medal of Reinhold-Maier Foundation
2003 Honorary Citizen of Künzelsau
2004 Knight of the Legion of Honour (France)
 Acceptance into the Business Hall of Fame (Initiative of Manager Magazin and the House of the History of the Federal Republic of Germany (Haus der Geschichte der Bundesrepublik Deutschland), Bonn, Germany)
 German Founder's Award for Lifetime Achievement
 Ludwig Erhard Prize for Business Journalism
 Diesel Gold Medal of the German Institute for Inventions
2005 Great Cross of Merit of the Federal Republic of Germany
 Officer in the Order of Orange-Nassau (Netherlands)
 Honorary Senator of the University of Stuttgart
May 2007: Honorary doctorate in art history and museum design at the University of Palermo
November 2007: Honorary doctorate from the University of Louisville (Kentucky, USA)
2008 Grand Order of Merit of South Tyrol
2009 University Award of the University of Tübingen
 Entrepreneur Award 2009 of the Business Club Aachen-Maastricht
2011 Emil Beck Memorial Award of the Fencing Club Tauberbischofsheim
2012 James Simon Prize of James Simon Foundation to Carmen and Reinhold Würth - Award for exemplary, social and cultural activities in Germany
 Carl-Friedrich Medal of the Faculty of Economics at the Karlsruhe Institute of Technology (KIT)
2013 International Folkwang Prize
2015: Honorary Citizen of Schwäbisch Hall

See also
List of billionaires

References

External links
Forbes.com: Forbes World's Richest People

1935 births
Living people
People from Öhringen
Businesspeople from Baden-Württemberg
20th-century German businesspeople
21st-century German businesspeople
German art collectors
20th-century art collectors
21st-century art collectors
German billionaires
German industrialists
People from the Free People's State of Württemberg
Chevaliers of the Légion d'honneur
Commanders Crosses of the Order of Merit of the Federal Republic of Germany
Recipients of the Order of Merit of Baden-Württemberg
Officers of the Order of Orange-Nassau
Chevaliers of the Ordre des Arts et des Lettres